Miss Thailand Universe 2007, the 8th Miss Thailand Universe pageant held at Sofitel Centara Grand Bangkok, in Bangkok, Thailand on March 24, 2007. The contestants arrived in Trang a week earlier to do some activities before came back to Bangkok for rehearsals.

In the final round, broadcast live on BBTV Channel 7, Farung Yuthithum, was crowned Miss Thailand Universe 2007 by Zuleyka Rivera, Miss Universe 2006 from Puerto Rico.

In May 2007, Farung Yuthithum represented Thailand in Miss Universe 2007 pageant in Mexico City, Mexico and placed in Top 15 of the competition. These make Thailand was called in semi-finalists round two years in a row.

Results
Color keys

The winner and two runner-up were awarded to participate internationally (two title from the Big Four international beauty pageants and two minor international beauty pageants) positions were given in the following order:

Placements

Special awards

Delegates

Withdraws
 #16 - Kempat Putthapruek, ( Nakhon Si Thammarat)
 #17 - Panisa Sujithum, ( Bangkok)
 #44 - Sudarat Somasri, (Chonburi)

Replaces
 #16 - Oranan Saengthong, ( Chaiyaphum)
 #17 - Supaporn Uppama, ( Nakhon Si Thammarat)
 #44 - Haruthai Hutakom, (Chonburi)

External links 
 Miss Thailand Universe official website
 T-Pageant Club

2007
2007 in Bangkok
2007 beauty pageants
March 2007 events in Thailand
Beauty pageants in Thailand